The Jama Masjid is a mosque built in 1612 AD, located near the Killa Arrak in Aurangabad, Maharashtra, India. It is historically significant because it was constructed in 1612 AD, very soon after the foundation of Aurangabad (then called "Khadki") by Malik Amber in 1610 AD. The mosque was later extended by Aurangzeb(R.H) in the year 1692 AD, it is one of the oldest mosques of Aurangabad which is still in good condition.

History

The mosque was constructed by Malik Amber in 1612 AD, once he found the city Kharaki in 1610 AD, and when Malik Ambar died in 1626 AD, and succeeded by his son Fateh Khan who changed the name of Khadki to "Fatehnagar". When Mughals captured Daulatabad in 1633 AD, the Nizam Shahi dominions, including Fatehnagar, fell under the possession of the Mughals. In 1653 AD, when Prince Aurangzeb was appointed the viceroy of the Deccan for the second time, he made Fatehnagar his capital and called it Aurangabad and built the fort Killa Arrak near the mosque, upon which the mosque felt in the boundaries of the fort walls expanding from Delhi gate to Mecca Gate. Realizing the architecture values of the mosque, Aurangzeb extended the mosque by constructing four Arches in the front portion in 1692 AD. Among the magnificent fort, Amkhar (Public Hall) and Jama Masjid are the only structures still remain in good condition.

Structure

The mosque is located near the Killa Arrak of Aurangabad. Out of the 9 pointed arches in the front 5 were erected by Malik Ambar.

References

See also
Tourist attractions in Aurangabad, Maharashtra
Aurangabad, Maharashtra

Mosques in Maharashtra
Tourist attractions in Aurangabad district, Maharashtra
Religious buildings and structures in Aurangabad, Maharashtra
Religious buildings and structures completed in 1612
Aurangabad